Yahoo! Music Unlimited was an on-demand online music service launched on May 10, 2005 and provided by Yahoo! Music. 
The service was discontinued on September 30, 2008.

Service
Users paid a subscription fee to access a library of over two million songs which could be either streamed or downloaded as DRM'd WMA files and played from a computer in near CD quality sound. Subscribers could also download songs at a discounted rate of $0.79 per song for transfer to CD or supported portable devices. Yahoo! Music Engine was the original client for the service. Subsequently, the client changed to the Yahoo! Music Jukebox. The service required an active Internet connection to play Yahoo! Music Unlimited tracks added to Yahoo! Music Jukebox's My Music.

Billing
Yahoo! offered two billing options: $8.99 monthly, or $71.88 billed annually (calculated to $5.99 per month). To transfer downloaded music to a compatible portable music player, an additional $6 per month were added to both plans. The subscription services were only available for users living in the U.S. or Canada and required a credit card (no other billing method was accepted).

Before November 1, 2005, the To Go feature was included at no extra charge. However, experts believe that this was done in order for Yahoo! to promote their service.

Features
Users who subscribed to Yahoo! Music Unlimited were able to stream and download an unlimited number of music tracks, but Janus DRM (digital rights management) technology prevents these tracks from being accessed once a user's subscription is discontinued or expires. Thus, if a user wishes to download and own a music track, they must pay an additional fee. The digital rights management employed by Yahoo prevents a user from freely distributing these tracks.

Users living outside the US or Canada could still download the player and enjoy the features of the Yahoo! Music Engine, a software product that functioned as a music collection organizer similar to iTunes.

Yahoo! tech support reported that Windows Media Audio codec, similar to MP3, was used at 192 kbit/s for all songs.  This is a high-quality encoding and without high-end playback equipment, nearly indistinguishable from CD.

Similar services
The former Napster To Go and Rhapsody Unlimited, provided by Napster and RealNetworks respectively, were both similar to Yahoo! Music Unlimited, although subscription fees were slightly higher. Yahoo also offered Musicmatch On Demand, a streaming music subscription service available through the Musicmatch Jukebox client. On August 31, 2007, Musicmatch Jukebox shut down. Musicmatch temporarily offered a free migration to Yahoo Music Unlimited.

Discontinuation
The Yahoo Music Unlimited service was discontinued on September 30, 2008. Yahoo's existing users were either transferred to Rhapsody (if they chose to transfer) or had their accounts deactivated. Yahoo-Rhapsody FAQ

See also
LAUNCHcast
Yahoo! Music
Yahoo Radish

References

Yahoo! Music Unlimited launches
Yahoo! Raises Fees for Online Digital Music Service
Yahoo Music Apparently Slated for Cutbacks

External links
Yahoo! Music Unlimited
List of devices compatible with Yahoo! Music Unlimited To Go
Yahoo! Music Unlimited Reviewed
Yahoo Music Unlimited Developer Ian Rogers Discusses The Service

Online music database clients
Defunct online music stores
Defunct digital music services or companies
Music Unlimited
Defunct online companies of the United States